Carmo may refer to:

 The Order of the Carmelites in Portuguese-speaking countries

Places

Brazil toponymy
 Carmo, a municipality in Rio de Janeiro
 Carmo da Cachoeira, municipality in Minas Gerais
 Carmo de Minas, municipality in Minas Gerais
 Carmo do Cajuru, municipality in Minas Gerais
 Carmo do Paranaíba, municipality in Minas Gerais
 Carmo do Rio Claro, municipality in Minas Gerais
 Carmo da Mata, municipality in Minas Gerais
 Carmo do Rio Verde, municipality in Goiás
 Monte do Carmo, a municipality in Tocantins
 Do Carmo River, a river in Rio Grande do Norte state

Other countries
 Carmo, or Carmo District, in Puntland, Somalia
 Monte Carmo, a mountain in Northern Italy
 Monte Carmo di Loano, a mountain in Northern Italy
 Carmo, the Roman name of Carmona, Spain

Churches and convents
 Carmo Convent (Lisbon)
 Convent of Nossa Senhora do Carmo (Lagoa)
 Carmo Church (Braga)

People
 Alberto do Carmo Neto
 Antônio do Carmo Cheuiche
 Carlos do Carmo
 Carmo de Souza
 Dalila Carmo
 Manuel Carmo
 Marcelo Luis de Almeida Carmo
 Maria do Carmo Seabra
 Maria do Carmo Silveira
 Matheus Henrique do Carmo Lopes
 Edmílson dos Santos Carmo Júnior
 Paulo Roberto do Carmo
 Wanderson do Carmo

See also

Carlo (name)

Portuguese-language surnames